Vanessa Grazziotin Bezerra (born June 29, 1961) is a Brazilian politician from the Communist Party of Brazil (PC do B). Although born in Videira, Santa Catarina, Grazziotin based her political career in the state of Amazonas. Twice elected to represent the state in the Chamber of Deputies, she was recently elected for the Federal Senate in the 2010 parliamentary election. She is the third Communist Senator ever in the history of Brazil, after Luís Carlos Prestes and Inácio Arruda. She is also Amazonas' communist first female Senator. Vanessa was a senator in the Brazilian state of Amazonas for eight years.

Career
On 1985, Vanessa Grazziotin graduated in the Pharmacy College of the Federal University of Amazonas. She has been a member of the Communist Party of Brazil (PC do B) since 1980, when the party was still illegal. Through PC do B, she was a councilwoman for Manaus for nine straight years, from 1989 to 1998, when she successfully ran for a seat in the Chamber of Deputies. She was re-elected twice, on 2002 and 2006. On 2004, she unsuccessfully ran for Mayor of Manaus, finishing the race in third place.

Among her proposals in the Chamber were the creation of a Green Seal for goods manufactured on the Manaus Free Trade Zone, the prohibition of the distribution of plastic bags, and the creation of the Day of African and Amerindian Culture (to be celebrated on May 13). The latter project was approved by the National Congress on March 30, 2010.

On 2010, Grazziotin ran for a seat in the Federal Senate. She was elected with 662,729 votes (22.8% of the total). Her election was rather impressive, once she defeated Arthur Virgílio, a prominent Senator from the Brazilian Social Democratic Party (PSDB). Virgílio accused Grazziotin of buying votes, the reason why he was called a "bad loser" by newsmagazine Istoé. Grazziotin claims she acted according to the Public Ministry guidelines.
On May 2, 2016, the Regional Electoral State Attorney presented a motion to the Superior Electoral Court in order to abrogate her Senate mandate for crimes against the Election Law regulations (money abuse during campaign).

Personal life
Grazziotin is married to fellow Communist politician Eron Bezerra, who acted as State Secretary for Rural Production in the Eduardo Braga administration and was recently elected to the Chamber of Deputies through PC do B. They have one daughter, named Rafaela.

References

External links
  Official website in the Chamber of Deputies portal
  Profile on the Vote na Web project

1961 births
Living people
People from Santa Catarina (state)
Brazilian people of Italian descent
Communist Party of Brazil politicians
Brazilian women in politics
Members of the Chamber of Deputies (Brazil) from Amazonas
Members of the Federal Senate (Brazil)
Federal University of Amazonas alumni
People from Manaus